Sønner av Norge (Sons of Norway) is a Norwegian comedy film from 1961 directed by Øyvind Vennerød. The script was written by Jørn Ording and Vennerød. Among others, Inger Marie Andersen, Odd Borg, Turid Balke, Arne Bang-Hansen, and Willie Hoel appear in the roles of the residents of Solbråten. The film was followed by the sequel Sønner av Norge kjøper bil.

Plot
In Solbråten, the men are so busy with the residents' association, community work, and the Norwegian Home Guard that they hardly have time to eat before they take a nap in the middle of the day. The fact that they also have to show up at work does not make life any easier. The acting dispatcher at the Solbråten post office, Gunnar Sørensen, is chairman of the main committee. He is assisted by the tax appraisal secretary Baltzersen (who has a telephone) and the master butcher Anton Andersen. The latter is also chairman of the name committee for Solbråtendagen, while Baltzersen is chairman of the entertainment, awards, and ribbon committee. Gunnar Sørensen is also quite interested in the "weaker sex." His wife Randi does not accept this. She allies herself with her school friend Eva Wikdahl, Solbråten's new dentist. Under Randi's determined leadership, the dentist sets her sights on Mr. Sørensen.

Cast

 Inger Marie Andersen as Gunnar's wife
 Odd Borg as Gunnar Sørensen, the postal dispatcher
 Ingerid Vardund as Eva Wikdahl, the dentist
 Turid Balke as Mrs. Baltzersen
 Arne Bang-Hansen as Baltzersen, the tax appraisal secretary
 Willie Hoel as Anton Andersen, the butcher
 Ingvald Bredangen as Gunnar's doctor
 Wilfred Breistrand as the client at the tax appraisal office
 Ellen Bugge as Baltzersen's secretary
 Aagot Børseth as a customer at the post office
 Lalla Carlsen as Gunnar Sørensen's mother
 Kari Diesen as Alfhild Andersen, the butcher's wife
 Tore Foss as Urias Ulm, a customer at the post office
 Elisabeth Granneman as the screaming woman
 Gustav Adolf Hegh
 Egil Hjorth-Jenssen as Setermoen, the editor of the newspaper Solbråten tidende
 Knut Hultgren as a member of the Norwegian Home Guard
 Ole Langerud as Michelsen on the committee
 Britta Lech-Hanssen
 Erling Lindahl as the Nynorsk proponent at the newspaper editorial office
 Grynet Molvig as  Ingrid Mollbakken, an employee at the post officet
 Arvid Nilssen as a car owner in Solbråten
 Randi Nordby as Mrs. Jørgensen
 Arve Opsahl as Evensen, the caretaker
 Knut Risan as a former subscriber with impermissible language
 Rolf Sand as Berg, a hairdresser
 Ragnar Schreiner
 Aud Schønemann as a resident of Solbråten
 Liv Uchermann Selmer 
 Arne Torvik as a member of the Norwegian Home Guard
 Annema Trosdahl 
 Arild Trønnes as a man in line at the tax appraisal office

References

External links
 
 Sønner av Norge at the National Library of Norway
 Sønner av Norge at Filmfront
 Sønner av Norge at the Swedish Film Database

1961 films
Norwegian comedy films